Ziridava is a genus of moths in the family Geometridae.

Species
Ziridava asterota Prout, 1958
Ziridava baliensis Prout, 1958
Ziridava dysorga Prout, 1928
Ziridava gemmata (Warren, 1899)
Ziridava kanshireiensis Prout, 1958
Ziridava khasiensis Prout, 1958
Ziridava rubridisca (Hampson, 1891)
Ziridava rufinigra C. Swinhoe, 1895
Ziridava xylinaria Walker, 1863

References

Eupitheciini